Amir Hamza Hotak (born 15 August 1991) is an Afghan cricketer.  He is a right-handed batsman who bowls slow left-arm orthodox.

Career
Hotak was part of the Afghanistan Under-19 team which took part in the ICC Under-19 World Cup in New Zealand.  He made one appearance, which came against Papua New Guinea Under-19s.  He later made his first-class debut for Afghanistan against Canada in the 2011-13 ICC Intercontinental Cup.  Hotak later made his One Day International debut in Afghanistan's first One Day International against a Full Member Test-playing nation, when they played Pakistan at Sharjah in February 2012.  Batting at number ten, Hotak was dismissed for a six ball duck by Wahab Riaz in Afghanistan's innings of 195, while in Pakistan's innings he bowled four wicketless overs, conceding 22 runs.  Pakistan won the encounter by 7 wickets.

He was the leading wicket-taker in the 2018 Ahmad Shah Abdali 4-day Tournament, finishing with 67 dismissals in ten matches.

In September 2018, he was named in Kandahar's squad in the first edition of the Afghanistan Premier League tournament.

Test cricket
In May 2018, he was named in Afghanistan's squad for their inaugural Test match, played against India, but he was not selected for the match. In November 2019, he was again named in Afghanistan's Test squad, this time for the one-off match against the West Indies. He made his Test debut for Afghanistan, against the West Indies, on 27 November 2019. In the match, he became the first bowler for Afghanistan to take a five-wicket haul on debut in Tests.

References

External links

1991 births
Living people
Afghan cricketers
Afghanistan Test cricketers
Afghanistan One Day International cricketers
Afghanistan Twenty20 International cricketers
Cricketers from Nangarhar Province
Pashtun people
Asian Games medalists in cricket
Cricketers at the 2014 Asian Games
Spin Ghar Tigers cricketers
Asian Games silver medalists for Afghanistan
Medalists at the 2014 Asian Games
Kandahar Knights cricketers
Cricketers who have taken five wickets on Test debut